Mathilda Marie Berthilde Paruta (21 November 1907 – 7 December 1999), better known as Darling Légitimus, was a French actress. In 1983, she received the Volpi Cup for Best Actress for her performance in the film Sugar Cane Alley.

Biography 

Born on 21 November 1907 at Le Carbet in Martinique, she spent her early years in Caracas, Venezuela. Mathilda Paruta arrived in Paris, France, at age of 16, wanting to become a dancer. She met Victor-Etienne Légitimus, son of the government deputy, Hegesippe Jean Légitimus, and went on to become his lifelong companion and bear him five children.

Known for a long time as Miss Darling, she later chose to go by the name of Darling Legitimus. She performed as a dancer in La Revue Nègre (1925) with Josephine Baker, and posed for Picasso as well as for sculptor Paul Belmondo, father of Jean-Paul Belmondo, the actor.

During the 1930s, Darling wrote, composed and sang numerous Caribbean songs such as Biguine and Mazurka. She often performed alongside known musicians of the era, including "Pe En Kin Sosso" and his band.

She also performed in plays by Jean Genet (Les Nègres) and Aimé Césaire. She was directed on the big screen by Raymond Rouleau in Les Sorcieres de Salem (The Crucible) alongside Simone Signoret and Yves Montand, and Le Salaire de la Peur (Wages of Fear) by Henri Georges Clouzot, with Sacha Guitry, Jean-Claude Brialy and Bernardo Bertolucci.

In 1983, at the age of 76, she won the Volpi Cup for the best female interpretation of "The Mostra of Venise", also for her role in La Rue Cases-Nègres (Sugar Cane Alley), directed by her compatriot Euzhan Palcy.
During her long life, she was acquainted with a great number of famous actors, among them Arletty, Fernandel, Marlon Brando and Pierre Brasseur. She also took part in numerous ORTF (Office de Radio-diffusion de la Television Française) productions, of which a telefilm by Jean-Christophe Averty, Les verts Paturages (The Green Pastures, written by Marc Connelly), was produced.

Death 

She died on 7 December 1999 at Kremlin-Bicetre in the Val de Marne near Paris, in France, without any more acting roles after Sugar Cane Alley in spite of hopes of her nomination and rewards.

Public tribute 
The writer, Calixthe Beyala and Caribbean actor Luc Saint-Eloy, representatives of "Liberté" collective came up on stage at the César ceremony in 2000, to claim one of the largest presence on French television screens and to pay her a public tribute, since the organizers had "forgotten" to name Darling as one of the previous year's great losses.

Filmography

Cinema 

1934: Bouboule 1er, roi nègre (by Léon Mathot)
1937: The Pearls of the Crown (by Sacha Guitry and Christian Jaque) - (uncredited)
1946: Un ami viendra ce soir (by Raymond Bernard) - (uncredited)
1946: Le Bateau à soupe  (by Maurice Gleize) - (uncredited)
1947: Les Trois cousines (by Jacques Daniel-Norman)
1950: Casimir (by Richard Pottier) - Caroline
1952: Le Chemin de Damas (by Max Glass)
1953: Le Salaire de la peur (by Henri-Georges Clouzot)
1953: Tourbillon (by Alfred Rode)
1954: Flesh and the Woman (by Robert Siodmak)
1955: Napoléon (by Sacha Guitry and Eugène Lourié) - La nourrice (uncredited)
1955: Le Port du désir (by Edmond T. Gréville) - La mère de Baba (uncredited)
1955: A Missionary (by Maurice Cloche)
1957: Les Sorcières de Salem (by Raymond Rouleau) - Tituba
1960: Women Are Like That (by Bernard Borderie) - Palmyre
1962: La Poupée (by Jacques Baratier) - (uncredited)
1963: Le Feu follet (by Louis Malle) - (uncredited)
1971: Boulevard du Rhum (by Robert Enrico) - La noire qui fredonne (uncredited)
1971: Le Cri du cormoran le soir au-dessus des jonques (by Michel Audiard)
1972: Églantine (by Jean-Claude Brialy) - Lolo
1972: Le Dernier Tango à Paris (by Bernardo Bertolucci) - La concierge
1973: La dernière bourrée à Paris (by Raoul André)
1976: Les vécés étaient fermés de l'intérieur (by Patrice Leconte) - Rose
1979: O Madiana (by Constant Gros-Dubois) - Mme Jonas
1980: La Bande du Rex −108-13 (by Jean-Henri Meunier) - Nounou
1980: 5% de risques (by Jean Pourtalé)
1983: Rue Cases-Nègres (by Euzhan Palcy) - M'Man Tine (final film role)

Television 

 La Case de l'oncle Tom (Uncle Tom's Cabin), written by Harriet Beecher Stowe(1963) .... Dinah
 Les Verts Pâturages (The Green Pastures), written by Marc Connelly Christmas 1964*
 La Redevance du fantôme (1966), adapted from a Henry James novel by Jean Gruault and realised by Robert Enrico.... Belinda
 Noëlle aux quatre vents, (1965 to 1969) realised by Henri Colpi.  TV
 Face aux Lancaster (1971) realised by Adonis Kyrou TV
 François Gaillard : La Vie des autres – France, by Jacques Ertaud (1971) TV  .... Datifa (segment Pierre)

Theater 
 Les Sorcières de Salem by Raymond Rouleau, adapted by Jean-Paul Sartre from Arthur Miller's novel The Crucible, in the Sarah Bernhardt Theater
 :  created 4 August 1964, presented at the Salzburg Festival, and in France the next year, at the Odéon theater in Paris, by the Dramatic Art Company: Europa Studio.
 Une saison au Congo, created on 4 October 1967 in Théâtre de l'Est Parisien by the Jean-Marie Serreau-Perinetti company.
 Équateur Funambule, juillet 1975, in the municipal theater of Fort-de-France in Martinique.
 À la rencontre du petit matin, March 1976, filmed in Guadeloupe and in Martinique. November 1976, the "Nouveau Carré" Sylvia Montfort. May 1976, "Ciné royal" in Boulogne-Billancourt. February 1977,in Vesinet (near Paris). December 1990, Biennale of Dakar (Senegal) 1st part of "Aventure ambiguë" filmed in Senegal for Memory of South.
 Gouverneur de la rosée written in 1944, by Jacques Roumain, paru en 1944, adapted for the "Théâtre Noir" (Black Theater), Paris, 1975.
 Vous ne l'emporterez pas avec vous (You Can't Take It with You) (1978) by Moss Hart and George S. Kaufman, produced and directed by Jean-Luc Moreau by Pierre Sabbagh (Au théâtre ce soir) ... Rébad
 Le Diable aux collants verts

References 

1907 births
1999 deaths
Martiniquais actresses
French people of Martiniquais descent
20th-century French actresses
Volpi Cup for Best Actress winners
Burials at Père Lachaise Cemetery